The Warsaw meridian is a meridian line running through Warsaw. The local mean time at the meridian was known as Warsaw Mean Time. It corresponds to an offset from UTC of +01:24.

The column also contains information in Russian.

History

In 1880, in the Theatre Square in front of the Jabłonowski Palace (then the city hall), a stone pillar was erected surrounded by an iron railing with a sign indicating the geographical location and the height above sea level and the level of Vistula. The Warsaw meridian passes through the top of the pillar and top of the clock tower of the Jabłonowski Palace, which served as point measurements. The plate on the sidewalk was constructed much later, in 1965.

Four years after the construction of the column in Warsaw, Greenwich Mean Time effectively became the international standard for time calculation around the world based on the Prime meridian at Greenwich in London.

The Meridian is featured in the 1965 film Pingwin (Penguin) starring Zbigniew Cybulski.

References 

1880 works
1880 in Poland
1880 establishments in the Russian Empire
Buildings and structures in Warsaw
Monuments and memorials in Warsaw
Named meridians
Prime meridians
Time in Poland